Neutral Port is a 1940 British war film directed by Marcel Varnel and starring Will Fyffe, Leslie Banks, Yvonne Arnaud, and Phyllis Calvert, with a supporting role for Wally Patch. It was produced and distributed by Gainsborough Pictures and shot at the company's Lime Grove Studios in West London. The film's sets were designed by the art director Alex Vetchinsky.

Plot summary
A British merchant ship is torpedoed by a German U-boat and takes shelter in a neutral port. The Captain then strikes back at the German enemy.

Cast

References

External links

1940 films
1940 war films
British war films
1940s English-language films
Gainsborough Pictures films
U-boat fiction
World War II films made in wartime
British black-and-white films
1940s British films
Films set in South America
Films shot at Lime Grove Studios